Michael Wright (1937–2012) was an Australian heir and businessman.

Biography

Early life
His late grandfather, Canon McClemans, founded Christ Church Grammar School. His late father, Peter Wright, co-founded Hancock Prospecting and Wright Prospecting with the late Lang Hancock, who was Gina Rinehart's father. His sister is Angela Bennett. He was born in Western Australia and attended Christ Church Grammar School.

Career
He started his career in the family concern, at Wright Prospecting. In 1991, he bought the Voyager Estate winery in Margaret River, Western Australia, despite being a teetotaller. He sat on the Board of Governors at the University of Notre Dame Australia in Fremantle.

Wealth
After his father's death, he inherited $900 million fortune with his sister. In 2010, he and his sister received AUS$1 billion from Gina Rinehart after she was legally forced to give up twenty-five per cent in the Rhodes Ridges iron ore mine 60 km west of Newman in the Pilbara. They owned fifteen per cent of Hamersley Iron shares from the Rio Tinto Group, Gina Rinehart owning the other fifty per cent. With his sister, he was worth US$2.3 billion or AUS$2.7 billion.

References

1937 births
2012 deaths
Australian businesspeople
Australian billionaires